Paul Reid may refer to:

 Paul Reid (footballer, born 1968), English football player
 Paul Reid (soccer, born 1979), Australian soccer player
 Paul Reid (footballer, born 1982), English football player
 Paul Reid (writer), American writer for Cox Newspapers and a biographer
 Paul Reid, pianist with the Arthur Lyman Group
 Paul Dennis Reid (1957–2013), American serial killer
 Paul Reid (artist) (born 1975), Scottish painter
 Paul Reid (actor), New Zealand actor
 Paul Reid (HSE), director-general of the Irish Health Service Executive

See also
Paul Read (disambiguation)
Paul Reed (disambiguation)